Bressler is a surname. Notable people with the surname include:

Bernard H. Bressler is a Canadian physiologist and neuroscientist
Charles Bressler (1926–1996), American tenor
Clotilde Bressler-Gianoli (1875–1912), Swiss-born opera singer
David M. Bressler (1879–1942), German-American social worker
Raymond G. Bressler, Sr. (1887–1948), American academic and college president
Rube Bressler (1894–1966), American left-handed pitcher in Major League Baseball
Shikma Bressler (born 1980), Israeli physicist

Fictional characters:
General Bressler, character in Falling Skies

See also
14977 Bressler, main-belt asteroid
Bressler-Enhaut-Oberlin, Pennsylvania, census-designated place (CDP) in Swatara Township, Dauphin County, Pennsylvania, United States
Bresler
Bresser